Baishi Town is an urban town in You County, Zhuzhou City, Hunan Province, People's Republic of China.

Cityscape
The town is divided into 8 villages and 1 community, the following areas: Baishi Community, Quantang Village, Fengta Village, Futou Village, Wenshui Village, Zhongzhou Village, Huguang Village, Zhangjing Village, and Qiangbei Village.

References

Historic township-level divisions of You County